François-Maximilien Bibaud (23 October 1823 –  9 July 1887) was a Canadian lawyer, professor of law, polygraph, and chronicler. Son of Michel Bibaud, has an important place in Canadian history because of his teaching of law and extensive writing on a variety of juridical subjects. He was born in Montreal, Quebec.

References 
 

1823 births
1887 deaths
Lawyers from Montreal